Yat sang ho kau is a Cantonese-language Hong Kong album by Danny Chan, released by Warner Music (WEA) in June 1989.

The title track became one of the top ten songs in the 1989 RTHK Top 10 Gold Songs Awards. In the 1989 Jade Solid Gold Best Ten Music Awards Presentation, it was ranked four of the Top Ten Gold Songs and won the Best Lyrics Awards Other singers have rendered this song since, including Deric Wan.

Track listing 
 "Hot Night"
 Music: To Tzi Tsi; Lyrics: Richard Lam
 "Heartbreak Road"
 Music: Michael Lai; Lyrics: Keith Chan Siu Kei
 "Speak without a Conscience" ( "Booi tseok leung saam dik suet wah")
 Music: Tsui Yat Kan; Lyrics: Lin Xi
 "Who Is a Friend?" ( "Seoi si gee gei")
 Music: Lam Manyee; Lyrics: Lin Xi
 "Wind Chimes" ( "Laang nuen fung ling")
 Music: Wong Ching Yu; Lyrics: Law Wing Keung
 "Meaning of Life" ( "yat sang ho kau")
 Cantonese rendition of Mandarin song, "Sometimes Thinking", from the album One Game, One Dream by Dave Wang
 Music: Wang Wen-ching; Lyrics: Poon Wai Jyun
 Opening theme of the TVB Drama Looking Back in Anger
 "Right or Wrong" ( "Deoi bat deoi")
 Music: Cho Chon Hung and Wong Dai Kwan; Lyrics: Poon Yuen Leung
 "Wanderer" ( "lau long tse")
 Cantonese rendition of 1960s song, "I Only Want to Be with You"
 Music: Mike Hawker and Ivor Raymonde; Lyrics: Poon Wai Jyun
 "Previously... as Always" ( "Kwo heoi... wing yuen dau jyu tsi")
 Cantonese rendition of Japanese song, "You", theme song of anime Oishinbo by 
 Music: ; Lyrics: Richard Lam
 "Sexy" ( "tse tsi"; lit. "Luxury")
 Cantonese rendition of "Looking for a New Love" by Jody Watley
 Music: Jody Watley and André Cymone; Lyrics: Thomas Chow

References

External links 
 Search results for 一生何求 at MDBG Chinese-English Dictionary

1989 albums
Danny Chan albums